Zophomyia temula is a species of fly in the family Tachinidae.

Distribution
This rather common species has a European distribution, and includes Transcaucasia, Kazakhstan and South Siberia.

Habitat
These flies preferably inhabit meadows, woodland, hedge rows and moist environments and they can usually be found in the grass and on low-hanging leaves.

Description

These fiies are shiny black on thorax and abdomen. Also legs and hairs are completely black, including the small setulae on the back of the head. This feature is quite unusual in the family Tachinidae. Moreovers the eyes are not so big and they are only sparsely haired. The body is quite slim and slightly elongated. The legs are relatively long and heavily hairy. The wings are mostly hyaline, but they are markedly yellow-orange at the base.

This species is rather similar to Mesembrina meridiana, belonging to the Muscidae family, characterized by a larger size and by the typical round shape of the true fly.

Biology
Adults can be found from April to August, feeding on nectar and pollen of flowers, especially of Heracleum sphondylium. Larvae are parasitoids, living literally into their hosts, until they die. The specific hosts are unknown.

References

External links

 Tachinid Recording Scheme
 Natura Mediterraneo

Diptera of Europe
Insects described in 1763
Tachininae
Taxa named by Giovanni Antonio Scopoli